Walter Joseph Bribeck (August 27, 1895 – June 7, 1944) was an American Negro league first baseman in the 1910s.

A native of Monett, Missouri, Bribeck played for the All Nations club in 1917. He went on to play minor league baseball into the 1920s for such teams as the Houston Buffaloes, Winston-Salem Twins, and Bloomington Bloomers. Bribeck died in Proviso, Illinois in 1944 at age 48.

References

External links
Baseball statistics and player information from Baseball-Reference Black Baseball Stats and Seamheads

1895 births
1944 deaths
All Nations players
Baseball first basemen
Baseball players from Missouri
People from Monett, Missouri
20th-century African-American sportspeople